Silver Bell is an album by American singer-songwriter Patty Griffin, released by A&M Records through UMe on October 8, 2013. It was originally recorded in 2000 as the follow-up to Griffin's second album Flaming Red (1998).

Production
Griffin recorded the album's fouteen tracks in 2000 at Daniel Lanois' Kingsway Studio in New Orleans, Louisiana. She was accompanied by co-producer Jay Joyce and Doug Lancio on guitar, John Deaderick on keyboards, Frank Swart on bass, and Billy Beard on percussion. Emmylou Harris sang harmony vocals on the track "Truth #2".

The album was newly mixed by Glyn Johns for its 2013 release.

Commercial performance
Silver Bell debuted at number 64 on the Billboard 200 and number 5 on the Billboard Folk Albums chart. As of September 2015, it had sold 21,000 copies in the United States.

Track listing

Chart performance

References

2013 albums
Patty Griffin albums
Albums produced by Glyn Johns
Universal Music Enterprises albums